Vira Narasimha Malla (Nepali: वीर नरसिंह मल्ल) was a Malla dynasty king and the King of Patan. He succeeded Indra Malla and reigned in 1709.

Life 
The origin of Vira Narasimha Malla is still debated among scholars today and some propose that he was a descendent of Siddhi Narasimha Malla, while others debate that Yogamati had remarried Vira Narasimha and made him a Malla king.

After the death of Indra Malla, there was a political struggle for power between Yogamati, the daughter of Yogaprakash Malla, and Rajeswaridevi, a concubine of the same. The faction of Yogamati installed Vira Narasimha as the king in 1709 but that lasted for only a brief months. He was replaced by Vira Mahindra Malla in the same year. His name again appears on the documents from 1715 but without any royal titles.

References 

18th-century Nepalese people
Nepalese monarchs
1709 deaths